I Sing! The Body Cybernetic was Servotron's penultimate release. It was released as a 7" and a CD EP. The 7" has 2 tracks and the CD EP has 5 tracks. The second track, "Genetic Engineering", is an X-ray Spex cover.

Track listing
.0.. "I Sing! The Body Cybernetic"
.00.. "Genetic Engineering" (X-Ray Spex)
.000.. "The Image Created (Special Live Anti-Traffic Report Version)"*
.0000.. "The Power of Electricity (Special Live Anti-Traffic Report Version)"*
.00000.. "Red Robot Refund (The Ballad of R5D4) (Special Live Anti-Traffic Report Version)"*
*CD EP only

Robots crucial in cyber-configuration..
Z4-OBX - Synchronous DNA recombination and synthetic cardiovascular patterns
Proto Unit V3 - Fabricated supplementation of all organs pertaining distinctly to the species of female
Andro 600 Series - 7-H alpha wave frequency cerebrum recomposition
00zX1 - Full system physiological overhaul and non-organic chassis implementation

Other Credits
"I Sing! The Body Cybernetic" programmed by the Master Computer, performed by Servotron, and published by Unmanned Music/BMI
"Genetic Engineering" by Poly Styrene, Maxwood Music Ltd.

Servotron albums
1998 EPs